"Mushroom" is a song by the German krautrock band Can, from their 1971 album Tago Mago. It's the shortest song on the album, with a duration of 4 minutes and 8 seconds. A video was made for the track which has been shown on MTV.

Content
The song has a hypnotic and repetitive structure. Vocalist Damo Suzuki repeats the phrase "When I saw mushroom head / I was born, I was dead" and "When I saw skies are red / I was born, I was dead" during the verses. For the chorus, he yells "I'm gonna give my despair". It has been suggested that the song refers to an atomic bomb blast and the feeling of despair. This is reinforced by the sound of a bomb explosion that abruptly ends the song. It has also been suggested that the lyrics refer to psilocybin mushrooms, which can give users psychedelic visions of rebirth.

Personnel
 Damo Suzuki – vocals
 Holger Czukay – bass
 Michael Karoli – guitar
 Jaki Liebezeit – drums, double bass
 Irmin Schmidt – Farfisa organ, electric piano, synthesizer

Cover versions
On Can vocalist Damo Suzuki's 1998 solo album V.E.R.N.I.S.S.A.G.E, a new version of this song is performed along with "Halleluhwah", another song originally from Tago  Mago. His band at the time featured Can's Jaki Liebezeit on drums.

The Serbian and former Yugoslav space rock band Igra Staklenih Perli covered the song on their eponymous debut album in 1979.

The song was covered by the band The Jesus and Mary Chain and is featured on the CD version of Barbed Wire Kisses.

The Flaming Lips' song "Take Meta Mars" from In a Priest Driven Ambulance is closely modeled on "Mushroom".

The Swedish band Komeda covered the song in their 1998 single "It's Alright, Baby"

References

1971 songs
Psychedelic songs
Can (band) songs